The United States became the world's largest producer of ethanol fuel in 2005. The U.S. produced 15.8 billion U.S. liquid gallons of ethanol fuel in 2019, and 13.9 billion U.S. liquid gallons (52.6 billion liters) in 2011, an increase from 13.2 billion U.S. liquid gallons (49.2 billion liters) in 2010, and up from 1.63 billion gallons in 2000. Brazil and U.S. production accounted for 87.1% of global production in 2011. In the U.S, ethanol fuel is mainly used as an oxygenate in gasoline in the form of low-level blends up to 10 percent, and, increasingly, as E85 fuel for flex-fuel vehicles. The U.S. government subsidizes ethanol production.  

The ethanol market share in the U.S. gasoline supply grew by volume from just over 1 percent in 2000 to more than 3 percent in 2006 to 10 percent in 2011. Domestic production capacity increased fifteen times after 1990, from 900 million US gallons to 1.63 billion US gal in 2000, to 13.5 billion US gallons in 2010. The Renewable Fuels Association reported 209 ethanol distilleries in operation located in 29 states in 2011.

By 2011 most cars on U.S. roads could run on blends of up to 10% ethanol(E10), and manufacturers had begun producing vehicles designed for much higher percentages. However, the fuel systems of cars, trucks, and motorcycles sold before the ethanol mandate may suffer substantial damage from the use of 10% ethanol blends. Flexible-fuel cars, trucks, and minivans use gasoline/ethanol blends ranging from pure gasoline up to 85% ethanol (E85). By early 2013 there were around 11 million E85-capable vehicles on U.S. roads. Regular use of E85 is low due to lack of fueling infrastructure, but is common in the Midwest. In January 2011 the U.S. Environmental Protection Agency (EPA) granted a waiver to allow up to 15% of ethanol blended with gasoline (E15) to be sold only for cars and light pickup trucks with a model year of 2001 or later. The EPA waiver authorizes, but does not require stations to offer E15. Like the limitations suffered by sales of E85, commercialization of E15 is constrained by the lack of infrastructure as most fuel stations do not have enough pumps to offer the new E15 blend, few existing pumps are certified to dispense E15, and no dedicated tanks are readily available to store E15.

Historically most U.S. ethanol has come from corn, and the required electricity for many distilleries came mainly from coal. There is a debate  about ethanol's sustainability and environmental impact. The primary issues related to the large amount of arable land required for crops and ethanol production's impact on grain supply, indirect land use change (ILUC) effects, as well as issues regarding its energy balance and carbon intensity considering its full life cycle.

History

In 1826 Samuel Morey experimented with an internal combustion chemical mixture that used ethanol (combined with turpentine and ambient air then vaporized) as fuel. At the time, his discovery was overlooked, mostly due to the success of steam power. Ethanol fuel received little attention until 1860 when Nicholas Otto began experimenting with internal combustion engines. In 1859, oil was found in Pennsylvania, which decades later provided a new kind of fuel. A popular fuel in the U.S. before petroleum was a blend of alcohol and turpentine called "camphene", also known as "burning fluid". The discovery of a ready supply of oil and unfavorable taxation on burning fluid made kerosene a more popular fuel.

In 1896, Henry Ford designed his first car, the "Quadricycle" to run on pure ethanol. In 1908, the revolutionary Ford Model T was capable of running on gasoline, ethanol or a combination. Ford continued to advocate for ethanol fuel even during the prohibition, but lower prices caused gasoline to prevail.

Gasoline containing up to 10% ethanol began a decades-long growth in the United States in the late 1970s. The demand for ethanol produced from field corn was spurred by the discovery that methyl tertiary butyl ether (MTBE) was contaminating groundwater. MTBE's use as an oxygenate additive was widespread due to mandates in the Clean Air Act amendments of 1992 to reduce carbon monoxide emissions. MTBE in gasoline had been banned in almost 20 states by 2006. Suppliers were concerned about potential litigation and a 2005 court decision denying legal protection for MTBE. MTBE's fall from grace opened a new market for ethanol, its primary substitute. Corn prices at the time were around US$2 a bushel. Farmers saw a new market and increased production. This demand shift took place at a time when oil prices were rising.

The steep growth in twenty-first century ethanol consumption was driven by federal legislation aimed to reduce oil consumption and enhance energy security. Of this requirement,  had to be advanced biofuels, defined as renewable fuels that reduce greenhouse gas emissions by at least 50%.

Recent trends

The world's top ethanol fuel producer in 2010 was the United States with 13.2 billion U.S. gallons (49.95 billion liters) representing 57.5% of global production, followed by Brazil with 6.92 billion U.S. gallons (26.19 billion liters), and together both countries accounted for 88% of the world production of 22.95 billion U.S. gallons (86.85 billion liters). By December 2010 the U.S. ethanol production industry consisted of 204 plants operating in 29 states, and 9 plants under construction or expansion, adding 560 million gallons of new capacity and bringing total U.S. installed capacity to 14.6 billion U.S. gallons (55.25 billion liters). At the end of 2010 over 90 percent of all gasoline sold in the U.S. was blended with ethanol.

Production

Beginning in late 2008 and early 2009, the industry came under financial stress due to that year's economic crisis. Motorists drove less and gasoline prices dropped sharply, while bank financing shrank. As a result, some plants operated below capacity, several firms closed plants, others laid off staff, some firms went bankrupt, plant projects were suspended and market prices declined. The Energy Information Administration raised concerns that the industry would not meet the legislated targets.

As of 2011, most of the U.S. car fleet was able to run on blends of up to 10% ethanol, and motor vehicle manufacturers produced vehicles designed to run on more concentrated blends. As of 2015, seven states – Missouri, Minnesota, Louisiana, Montana, Oregon, Pennsylvania, and Washington – required ethanol to be blended with gasoline in motor fuels. These states, particularly Minnesota, had more ethanol usage, and according to a source at Washington University, these states accumulated substantial environmental and economic benefits as a result. Florida required ethanol blends as of the end of 2010, but has since repealed it. Many cities had separate ethanol requirements due to non-attainment of federal air quality standards. In 2007, Portland, Oregon, became the first U.S. city to require all gasoline sold within city limits to contain at least 10% ethanol. Chicago has proposed the idea of mandating E15 in the city limits, while some area gas stations have already begun offering it.

Expanding ethanol (and biodiesel) industries provided jobs in plant construction, operations, and maintenance, mostly in rural communities. According to RFA the ethanol industry created almost 154,000 U.S. jobs in 2005, boosting household income by $5.7 billion. It also contributed about $3.5 billion in federal, state and local tax revenues.

The return on investment (ROI) to upgrade a service station to sell E15 is quick given today's markets. Given ethanol's discount to gasoline and the current value of RINs, retailers offering mid-level ethanol blends like E15 can quickly recoup their investments in infrastructure. Federal, state and local incentives and grant programs are available in most areas, and would further help reduce the cost of equipment and installation. E15 is a higher octane fuel, it is currently available in 29 states at retail fueling stations. E15 was approved for use in model year 2001 and newer cars, light-duty trucks, medium-duty passenger vehicles (SUVs), and all flex-fuel vehicles (FFVs) by the U.S. Environmental Protection Agency (EPA) in 2012.

E85 vehicles
 

Ford, Chrysler, and GM are among many automobile companies that sell flexible-fuel vehicles that can run blends ranging from pure gasoline to 85% ethanol (E85), and beginning in 2008 almost any type of automobile and light duty vehicle was available with the flex-fuel option, including sedans, vans, SUVs and pickup trucks. By early 2013, about 11 million E85 flex-fuel cars and light trucks were in operation, though actual use of E85 fuel was limited, because the ethanol fueling infrastructure was limited.

As of 2005, 68% of American flex-fuel car owners were not aware they owned an E85 flex. Flex and non-flex vehicles looked the same. There was no price difference. American automakers did not label these vehicles. In contrast, all Brazilian automakers clearly labeled FFVs with text that was some variant of the word Flex. Beginning in 2007 many new FFV models in the US featured a yellow gas cap to remind drivers of the E85 capabilities. As of 2008, GM badged its vehicles with the text "Flexfuel/E85 Ethanol". Nevertheless, the U.S. Department of Energy (DOE) estimated that in 2009 only 504,297 flex-fuel vehicles were regularly fueled with E85, and these were primarily fleet-operated vehicles. As a result, only 712 million gallons were used for E85, representing just 1% of that year's ethanol consumption.

During the decade following 2000, E85 vehicles became increasingly common in the Midwest, where corn was a major crop.

Fueling infrastructure has been a major restriction hampering E85 sales. , there were 3,028 fueling stations selling E85 in the U.S. Most stations were in the Corn Belt states. As of 2008 the leading state was Minnesota with 353 stations, followed by Illinois with 181, and Wisconsin with 114. About another 200 stations that dispensed ethanol were restricted to city, state and federal government vehicles.

E15 blend

In March 2009 Growth Energy, a lobbying group for the ethanol industry, formally requested the U.S. Environmental Protection Agency (EPA) to allow the ethanol content in gasoline to be increased to 15%, from 10%. In October 2010, the EPA granted a waiver to allow up to 15% blends to be sold for cars and trucks with a model year of 2007 or later, representing about 15% of vehicles on the roads. In January 2011 the waiver was expanded to authorize use of E15 to include model year 2001 through 2006 passenger vehicles. The EPA also decided not to grant any waiver for E15 use in any motorcycles, heavy-duty vehicles, or non-road engines because current testing data does not support such a waiver. According to the Renewable Fuels Association the E15 waivers now cover 62% of vehicles on the road in the country. In December 2010 several groups, including the Alliance of Automobile Manufacturers, the American Petroleum Institute, the Association of International Automobile Manufacturers, the National Marine Manufacturers Association, the Outdoor Power Equipment Institute, and the Grocery Manufacturers Association, filed suit against the EPA. In August 2012 the federal appeals court rejected the suit against the EPA ruling that the groups did not have legal standing to challenge EPA's decision to issue the waiver for E15. In June 2013 the U.S. Supreme Court declined to hear an appeal from industry groups opposed to the EPA ruling about E15 and let the 2012 federal appeals court ruling stand.

According to a survey conducted by the American Automobile Association (AAA) in 2012, only about 12 million out of the more than 240 million light-duty vehicles on the U.S. roads in 2012 are approved by manufacturers are fully compliant with E15 gasoline. According with the Association, BMW, Chrysler, Nissan, Toyota, and Volkswagen warned that their warranties will not cover E15-related damage. Despite the controversy, in order to adjust to EPA regulations, 2012 and 2013 model year vehicles manufactured by General Motors can use fuel containing up to 15 percent ethanol, as indicated in the vehicle owners' manuals. However, the carmaker warned that for model year 2011 or earlier vehicles, they "strongly recommend that GM customers refer to their owners manuals for the proper fuel designation for their vehicles." Ford Motor Company also is manufacturing all of its 2013 vehicles E15 compatible, including hybrid electrics and vehicles with Ecoboost engines. Also Porsches built since 2001 are approved by its manufacturer to use E15. Volkswagen announced that for the 2014 model year, its entire lineup will be E15 capable. Fiat Chrysler Automobiles announced in August 2015 that all 2016 model year Chrysler/Fiat, Jeep, Dodge and Ram vehicles will be E15 compatible.

Despite EPA's waiver, there is a practical barrier to the commercialization of the higher blend due to the lack of infrastructure, similar to the limitations suffered by sales of E85, as most fuel stations do not have enough pumps to offer the new blend, few existing pumps are certified to dispense E15, and there are no dedicated tanks readily available to store E15. In July 2012 a fueling station in Lawrence, Kansas became the first in the U.S. to sell the E15 blend. The fuel is sold through a blender pump that allows customers to choose between E10, E15, E30 or E85, with the latter blends sold only to flexible-fuel vehicles. This station was followed by a Marathon fueling station in East Lansing, Michigan. , there are about 24 fueling stations selling E15 out of 180,000 stations operating across the U.S.

, sales of E15 are not authorized in California, and according to the California Air Resources Board (CARB), the blend is still awaiting approval, and in a public statement the agency said that "it would take several years to complete the vehicle testing and rule development necessary to introduce a new transportation fuel into California's market."

Legislation and regulations

The Energy Independence and Security Act of 2007, directed DOE to assess the feasibility of using intermediate ethanol blends in the existing vehicle fleet. The National Renewable Energy Laboratory (NREL) evaluated the potential impacts on legacy vehicles and other engines. In a preliminary report released in October 2008, NREL described the effects of E10, E15 and E20 on tailpipe and evaporative emissions, catalyst and engine durability, vehicle driveability, engine operability, and vehicle and engine materials. For example, E20 reduced average fuel economy by 7.7% when compared to gas-only (E0) test vehicles.

The Obama Administration set the goal of installing 10,000 blender pumps nationwide by 2015. These pumps can dispense multiple blends including E85, E50, E30 and E20 that can be used by E85 vehicles. The US Department of Agriculture (USDA) issued a rule in May 2011 to include flexible fuel pumps in the Rural Energy for America Program (REAP). This ruling provided financial assistance, via grants and loan guarantees, to fuel station owners to install E85 and blender pumps.

In May 2011 the Open Fuel Standard Act (OFS) was introduced to Congress with bipartisan support. The bill required that 50 percent of automobiles made in 2014, 80 percent in 2016, and 95 percent in 2017, be manufactured and warrantied to operate on non-petroleum-based fuels, which included existing technologies such as flex-fuel, natural gas, hydrogen, biodiesel, plug-in electric and fuel cell. Considering the rapid adoption of flexible-fuel vehicles in Brazil and the fact that the cost of making flex-fuel vehicles was approximately $100 per car, the bill's primary objective was to promote a massive adoption of flex-fuel vehicles capable of running on ethanol or methanol fuel.

In November 2013, the Environmental Protection Agency opened for public comment its proposal to reduce the amount of ethanol required in the US gasoline supply as mandated by the Energy Independence and Security Act of 2007. The agency cited problems with increasing the blend of ethanol above 10%. This limit, known as the "blend wall", refers to the practical difficulty in incorporating increasing amounts of ethanol into the transportation fuel supply at volumes exceeding those achieved by the sale of nearly all gasoline as E10.

Contractual restrictions
Gasoline distribution contracts in the United States generally have provisions that make offering E15 and E85 difficult, expensive, or even impossible. Such provisions include requirements that no E85 be sold under the gas station canopy, labeling requirements, minimum sales volumes, and exclusivity provisions. Penalties for breach are severe and often allow immediate termination of the agreement, cutting off supplies to retailers. Repayment of franchise royalties and other incentives is often required.

Energy security
 
One rationale for ethanol production in the U.S. is increased energy security, from shifting supply from oil imports to domestic sources. Ethanol production requires significant energy, and current U.S. production derives most of that energy from domestic coal, natural gas and other non-oil sources. Because in 2006, 66% of U.S. oil consumption was imported, compared to a net surplus of coal and just 16% of natural gas (2006 figures), the displacement of oil-based fuels to ethanol produced a net shift from foreign to domestic U.S. energy sources.

Effect on gasoline prices
The effect of ethanol use on gasoline prices is the source of conflicting opinion from economic studies, further complicated by the non-market forces of tax credits, met and unmet government quotas, and the dramatic recent increase in domestic oil production. According to a 2012 Massachusetts Institute of Technology analysis, ethanol, and biofuel in general, does not materially influence the price of gasoline, while a runup in the price of government mandated Renewable Identification Number credits has driven up the price of gasoline. These are in contrast to a May 2012, Center for Agricultural and Rural Development study which showed a $0.29 to $1.09 reduction in per gallon gasoline price from ethanol use.

The EPA announced in November 2013, a reduction in mandated U.S. 2014 ethanol production, due to "market conditions".

Tariffs and tax credits
Since the 1980s until 2011, domestic ethanol producers were protected by a 54-cent per gallon import tariff, mainly intended to curb Brazilian sugarcane ethanol imports. Beginning in 2004 blenders of transportation fuel received a tax credit for each gallon of ethanol they mix with gasoline. Historically, the tariff was intended to offset the federal tax credit that applied to ethanol regardless of country of origin. Several countries in the Caribbean Basin imported and reprocessed Brazilian ethanol, usually converting hydrated ethanol into anhydrous ethanol, for re-export to the United States. They avoided the 2.5% duty and the tariff, thanks to the Caribbean Basin Initiative (CBI) and free trade agreements. This process was limited to 7% of U.S. ethanol consumption.

Tax credits to promote the production and consumption of biofuels date to the 1970s. For 2011, credits were based on the Energy Policy Act of 2005, the Food, Conservation, and Energy Act of 2008, and the Energy Improvement and Extension Act of 2008.

A 2010 study by the Congressional Budget Office (CBO) found that in fiscal year 2009, biofuel tax credits reduced federal revenues by around  billion, of which corn and cellulosic ethanol accounted for  billion and  million, respectively.

In 2010, CBO estimated that taxpayer costs to reduce gasoline consumption by one gallon were $1.78 for corn ethanol and $3.00 for cellulosic ethanol. In a similar way, and without considering potential indirect land use effects, the costs to taxpayers of reducing greenhouse gas emissions through tax credits were about $750 per metric ton of -equivalent for ethanol and around $275 per metric ton for cellulosic ethanol.

On June 16, 2011, the U.S. Congress approved an amendment to an economic development bill to repeal both the tax credit and the tariff, but this bill did not move forward. Nevertheless, the U.S. Congress did not extend the tariff and the tax credit, allowing both to end on December 31, 2011. Since 1980 the ethanol industry was awarded an estimated  billion in subsidies.

Feedstocks

Corn

Corn is the main feedstock used for producing ethanol fuel in the United States. Most of the controversies surrounding U.S. ethanol fuel production and use is related to corn ethanol's energy balance and its social and environmental impacts.

Cellulose

Cellulosic sources have the potential to produce a renewable, cleaner-burning, and carbon-neutral alternative to gasoline. In his State of the Union Address on January 31, 2006, President George W. Bush stated, "We'll also fund additional research in cutting-edge methods of producing ethanol, not just from corn, but from wood chips and stalks or switchgrass. Our goal is to make this new kind of ethanol practical and competitive within six years."

On July 7, 2006, DOE announced a new research agenda for cellulosic ethanol. The 200-page scientific roadmap cited recent advances in biotechnology that could aid use of cellulosic sources. The report outlined a detailed research plan for additional technologies to improve production efficiency. The roadmap acknowledged the need for substantial federal loan guarantees for biorefineries.

The 2007 federal budget earmarked $150 million for the research effort – more than doubling the 2006 budget. DOE invested in enzymatic, thermochemical, acid hydrolysis, hybrid hydrolysis/enzymatic, and other research approaches targeting more efficient and lower–cost conversion of cellulose to ethanol.

The first materials considered for cellulosic biofuel included plant matter from agricultural waste, yard waste, sawdust and paper. Professors R. Malcolm Brown Jr. and David Nobles, Jr. of the University of Texas at Austin developed cyanobacteria that had the potential to produce cellulose, glucose and sucrose, the latter two easily converted into ethanol. This offers the potential to create ethanol without plant matter.

Sugar

Producing ethanol from sugar is simpler than converting corn into ethanol. Converting sugar requires only a yeast fermentation process. Converting corn requires additional cooking and the application of enzymes. The energy requirement for sugar conversion is about half that for corn. Sugarcane produces more than enough energy to do the conversion with energy left over. A 2006 U.S. Department of Agriculture report found that at market prices for ethanol, converting sugarcane, sugar beets and molasses to ethanol would be profitable. As of 2008 researchers were attempting to breed new varieties adapted to U.S. soil and weather conditions, as well as to take advantage of cellulosic ethanol technologies to also convert sugarcane bagasse.

U.S. sugarcane production occurs in Florida, Louisiana, Hawaii, and Texas. The first three plants to produce sugarcane-based ethanol went online in Louisiana in mid-2009. Sugar mills in Lacassine, St. James and Bunkie were converted to sugarcane ethanol production using Colombian technology to enable profitable ethanol production. These three plants planned to produce  of ethanol per year within five years.

By 2009 two other sugarcane ethanol production projects were being developed in Kauai, Hawaii and Imperial Valley, California. The Hawaiian plant was projected to have a capacity of between  a year and to supply local markets only, as shipping costs made competing in the continental US impractical. This plant went online in 2010. The California plant was expected to produce  a year in 2011.

In March 2007, "ethanol diplomacy" was the focus of President George W. Bush's Latin American tour, in which he and Brazil's president, Luiz Inacio Lula da Silva, promoted the production and use of sugarcane ethanol throughout the Caribbean Basin. The two countries agreed to share technology and set international biofuel standards. Brazilian sugarcane technology transfer was intended to permit various Central American, such as Honduras, El Salvador, Nicaragua, Costa Rica and Panama, several Caribbean countries, and various Andean Countries tariff-free trade with the U.S., thanks to existing trade agreements. The expectation was that such countries would export to the United States in the short-term using Brazilian technology.

Brazil began exporting ethanol to the U.S. in 2004 and exported  representing 44.3% of U.S. ethanol imports in 2007. The remaining imports that year came from Canada and China.

Other feedstocks

Comparison with Brazilian ethanol
Sugarcane ethanol has an energy balance seven times greater than corn ethanol. As of 2007, Brazilian distiller production costs were 22 cents per liter, compared with 30 cents per liter for corn-based ethanol. Corn-derived ethanol costs 30% more because the corn starch must first be converted to sugar before distillation into alcohol. However, corn-derived ethanol offers the ability to return 1/3 of the feedstock to the market as a replacement for the corn used in the form of Distillers Dried Grain. Sugarcane ethanol production is seasonal: unlike corn, sugarcane must be processed into ethanol almost immediately after harvest.

Environmental and social impact

Environmental effects

Energy balance and carbon intensity
Until 2008, several full life cycle ("Well to Wheels") studies had found that corn ethanol reduces greenhouse gas emissions as compared to gasoline. In 2007 a team led by Farrel from the University of California, Berkeley evaluated six previous studies and concluded corn ethanol reduces greenhouse gas emissions by only 13 percent. Another figure is 20 to 30 percent, and an 85 to 85 percent reduction for cellulosic ethanol. Both figures were estimated by Wang from Argonne National Laboratory, based on a comprehensive review of 22 studies conducted between 1979 and 2005, and simulations with Argonne's GREET model. All of these studies included direct land use changes. However, further research examining the actual effects of the Renewable Fuel Standard from 2008 to 2016 has concluded that corn ethanol produces more carbon emissions per unit of energy – likely more than 24% more – than gasoline, when factoring in fertilizer use and land use change.

The reduction estimates on carbon intensity for a given biofuel depend on the assumptions regarding several variables, including crop productivity, agricultural practices, and distillery power source and energy efficiency. None of these earlier studies considered the effects of indirect land-use changes, and though their impact was recognized, its estimation was considered too complex and more difficult to model than direct land use changes.

Effects of land use change
 

Two 2008 studies, both published in the same issue of Scienceexpress, questioned the previous assessments. A team led by Searchinger from Princeton University concluded that once direct and indirect effect of land use changes (ILUC) are considered, both corn and cellulosic ethanol increased carbon emissions as compared to gasoline by 93 and 50 percent respectively. The study limited the analysis to a 30-year time horizon, assuming that land conversion emitted 25 percent of the carbon stored in soils and all carbon in plants cleared for cultivation. Brazil, China and India were considered among the overseas locations where land use change would occur as a result of diverting U.S. corn cropland, and it was assumed that new cropland in each of these regions correspond to different types of forest, savanna or grassland based on the historical proportion of each natural land converted to cultivation in these countries during the 1990s.

A team led by Fargione from The Nature Conservancy found that clearing natural lands for use as agricultural land to produce biofuel feedstock creates a carbon debt. Therefore, this carbon debt applies to both direct and indirect land use changes. The study examined six scenarios of wilderness conversion, Brazilian Amazon to soybean biodiesel, Brazilian Cerrado to soybean biodiesel, Brazilian Cerrado to sugarcane ethanol, Indonesian or Malaysian lowland tropical rainforest to palm biodiesel, Indonesian or Malaysian peatland tropical rainforest to oil palm forest, and U.S. Central grassland to corn ethanol.

Low-carbon fuel standards

On April 23, 2009, the California Air Resources Board approved specific rules and carbon intensity reference values for the California Low-Carbon Fuel Standard (LCFS) that was to go into effect on January 1, 2011. The consultation process produced controversy regarding the inclusion and modeling of indirect land use change effects. After the CARB's ruling, among other criticisms, representatives of the ethanol industry complained that the standard overstated the negative environmental effects of corn ethanol, and also criticized the inclusion of indirect effects of land-use changes as an unfair penalty to home-made corn ethanol because deforestation in the developing world had been tied to US ethanol production. The emissions standard for 2011 for LCFS meant that Midwest corn ethanol would not meet the California standard unless current carbon intensity is reduced.

A similar controversy arose after the U.S. Environmental Protection Agency (EPA) published on May 5, 2009, its notice of proposed rulemaking for the new Renewable Fuel Standard (RFS). EPA's proposal included the carbon footprint from indirect land-use changes. On the same day, President Barack Obama signed a Presidential Directive with the aim to advance biofuel research and commercialization. The Directive asked a new Biofuels Interagency Working Group comprising the Department of Agriculture, EPA, and DOE, to develop a plan to increase flexible fuel vehicle use, assist in retail marketing and to coordinate infrastructure policies.

The group also was tasked to develop policy ideas for increasing investment in next-generation fuels, and for reducing biofuels' environmental footprint.

In December 2009 two lobbying groups, the Renewable Fuels Association (RFA) and Growth Energy, filed a lawsuit challenging LCFS's constitutionality. The two organizations argued that LCFS violates both the Supremacy Clause and the Commerce Clause of the US Constitution, and "jeopardizes the nationwide market for ethanol." In a press release the associations announced that "If the United States is going to have a low carbon fuel standard, it must be based on sound science and it must be consistent with the U.S. Constitution".

On February 3, 2010, EPA finalized the Renewable Fuel Standard Program (RFS2) for 2010 and beyond. EPA incorporated direct emissions and significant indirect emissions such as emissions from land use changes along with comments and data from new studies. Adopting a 30-year time horizon and a 0% discount rate EPA declared that ethanol produced from corn starch at a new (or expanded capacity from an existing) natural gas-fired facility using approved technologies would be considered to comply with the 20% GHG emission reduction threshold. Given average production conditions it expected for 2022, EPA estimated that corn ethanol would reduce GHGs an average of 21% compared to the 2005 gasoline baseline. A 95% confidence interval spans a 7-32% range reflecting uncertainty in the land use change assumptions.

The following table summarizes the mean GHG emissions for ethanol using different feedstocks estimated by EPA modelling and the range of variations considering that the main source of uncertainty in the life cycle analysis is the GHG emissions related to international land use change.

Water footprint
Water-related concerns relate to water supply and quality, and include availability and potential overuse, pollution, and possible contamination by fertilizers and pesticides. Several studies concluded that increased ethanol production was likely to result in a substantial increase in water pollution by fertilizers and pesticides, with the potential to exacerbate eutrophication and hypoxia, particularly in the Chesapeake Bay and the Gulf of Mexico.

Growing feedstocks consumes most of the water associated with ethanol production. In general terms, both corn and switchgrass require less irrigation than other fuel crops. Corn is grown mainly in regions with adequate rainfall. However, corn usually needs to be irrigated in the drier climates of Nebraska and eastern Colorado. Further, corn production for ethanol is increasingly taking place in areas requiring irrigation. A 2008 study by the National Research Council concluded that "in the longer term, the likely expansion of cellulosic biofuel production has the potential to further increase the demand for water resources in many parts of the United States. Biofuels expansion beyond current irrigated agriculture, especially in dry western areas, has the potential to greatly increase pressure on water resources in some areas."

In 2010 RFA argued that more efficient water technologies and pre-treated water could reduce consumption. It further claimed that non-conventional oil "sources, such as tar sands and oil shale, require far more water than conventional petroleum extraction and refining."

U.S. standard agricultural practices for most crops employ fertilizers that provide nitrogen and phosphorus along with herbicides, fungicides, insecticides, and other pesticides.

Some part of these chemicals leaves the field. Nitrogen in forms such as nitrate (NO3) is highly soluble, and along with some pesticides infiltrates downwards toward the water table, where it can migrate to water wells, rivers and streams. A 2008 National Research Council study found that regionally the highest stream concentrations occur where the rates of application were highest, and that these rates were highest in the Corn Belt. These flows mainly stem from corn, which as of 2010 was the major source of total nitrogen loading to the Mississippi River.

Several studies found that corn ethanol production contributed to the worsening of the Gulf of Mexico dead zone. The nitrogen leached into the Mississippi River and out into the Gulf, where it fed giant algae blooms. As the algae died, it settled to the ocean floor and decayed, consuming oxygen and suffocating marine life, causing hypoxia. This oxygen depletion killed shrimp, crabs, worms and anything else that could not escape, and affected important shrimp fishing grounds.

Social implications

Effect on food prices 

Some environmentalists, such as George Monbiot, expressed fears that the marketplace would convert crops to fuel for the rich, while the poor starved and biofuels caused environmental problems. The food vs fuel debate grew in 2008 as a result of the international community's concerns regarding the steep increase in food prices. In April 2008, Jean Ziegler, back then United Nations Special Rapporteur on the Right to Food, repeated his claim that biofuels were a "crime against humanity", echoing his October 2007 call for a 5-year ban for the conversion of land for the production of biofuels. Also in April 2008, World Bank President Robert Zoellick stated that "While many worry about filling their gas tanks, many others around the world are struggling to fill their stomachs. And it's getting more and more difficult every day."

A July 2008 World Bank report found that from June 2002 to June 2008 "biofuels and the related consequences of low grain stocks, large land use shifts, speculative activity and export bans" accounted for 70–75% of total price rises. The study found that higher oil prices and a weak dollar explain 25–30% of total price rise. The study said that "large increases in biofuels production in the United States and Europe are the main reason behind the steep rise in global food prices." The report argued that increased production of biofuels in these developed regions was supported by subsidies and tariffs, and claimed that without such policies, food price increases worldwide would have been smaller. It also concluded that Brazil's sugarcane ethanol had not raised sugar prices significantly, and recommended that both the U.S. and E.U. remove tariffs, including on many African countries.

An RFA rebuttal said that the World Bank analysis was highly subjective and that the author considered only "the impact of global food prices from the weak dollar and the direct and indirect effect of high petroleum prices and attribute[d] everything else to biofuels."

A 2010 World Bank study concluded that its previous study may have overestimated the impact, as "the effect of biofuels on food prices has not been as large as originally thought, but that the use of commodities by financial investors (the so-called 'financialization of commodities') may have been partly responsible for the 2007/08 spike."

A July 2008 OECD economic assessment agreed about the negative effects of subsidies and trade restrictions, but found that the impact of biofuels on food prices was much smaller. The OECD study found that existing biofuel support policies would reduce greenhouse gas emissions by no more than 0.8 percent by 2015. It called for more open markets in biofuels and feedstocks to improve efficiency and lower costs. The OECD study concluded that "current biofuel support measures alone are estimated to increase average wheat prices by about 5 percent, maize by around 7 percent and vegetable oil by about 19 percent over the next 10 years."

During the 2008 financial crisis corn prices, fell 50% from their July 2008 high by October 2008, in tandem with other commodities, including oil, while corn ethanol production continued unabated. "Analysts, including some in the ethanol sector, say ethanol demand adds about 75 cents to $1.00 per bushel to the price of corn, as a rule of thumb. Other analysts say it adds around 20 percent, or just under 80 cents per bushel at current prices. Those estimates hint that $4 per bushel corn might be priced at only $3 without demand for ethanol fuel."

Reviewing eight years of actual implementation of the Renewable Fuel Standard, researchers from the University of Wisconsin found the standard increased corn prices by 30% and prices of other crops by 20%.

See also

2007 U.S. Farm Bill
2007–2008 world food price crisis
Butanol fuel
Common ethanol fuel mixtures
E85 in the United States
Ethanol fuel by country
Ethanol fuel in Australia
Ethanol fuel in Brazil
Ethanol fuel in Hawaii
Ethanol fuel in the Philippines
Ethanol fuel in Sweden
Indirect land use change impacts of biofuels
Issues relating to biofuels
List of renewable energy topics by country
Low-carbon fuel standard
Renewable energy in the United States
Renewable Fuel Standard

Further reading
 Duffield, James A., Irene M. Xiarchos, and Steve A. Halbrook, "Ethanol Policy: Past, Present, and Future", South Dakota Law Review. 53 (no. 3, 2008), 425–53.

References

External links

U.S. government
Effects of Increased Biofuels on the U.S. Economy in 2022, U.S. Department of Agriculture, October 2010.
U.S. Ethanol Fuel: Data, Analysis and Trends, U.S. Department of Energy
Using Biofuel Tax Credits to Achieve Energy and Environmental Policy Goals, Congressional Budget Office, July 2010.

International organizations
Towards Sustainable Production and Use of Resources: Assessing Biofuels by the United Nations Environment Programme, October 2009.
World Bank, Biofuels: The Promise and the Risks. World Development Report 2008: Agriculture for Development

Other sources
Renewable Fuels Association web site
Thermodynamics of the Corn-Ethanol biofuel cycle, T.Patzek

Biofuel in the United States
Ethanol fuel